Back Together Again is an album by Fred Anderson with Hamid Drake.

Back Together Again may refer to:

 "Back Together Again", a 1976 song by Daryl Hall & John Oates from Bigger Than Both of Us
 "Back Together Again", a 1979 song by Roberta Flack and Donny Hathaway from Roberta Flack Featuring Donny Hathaway